Miltiadis Varvitsiotis (Greek: Μιλτιάδης Βαρβιτσιώτης, Miltiádis Varvitsiótis; born June 21, 1969) is a Greek politician and attorney, serving as Alternate Minister of Foreign Affairs for European Affairs in the Cabinet of Kyriakos Mitsotakis, since July 9, 2019. A member of the New Democracy, he is a Member of the Hellenic Parliament for Athens B2 (West Suburbs). 

He previously served as Minister of Shipping and the Aegean (2013–2015) in the Cabinet of Antonis Samaras, and Deputy Minister of Foreign Affairs (2009) in the Cabinet of Kostas Karamanlis II.

Early life and career 
Miltiadis Varvitsiotis was born in Glyfada, Attica on June 21, 1969. He is son of former Minister Ioannis Varvitsiotis. In 1987, he graduated from Athens College. He studied Athens Law School of National and Kapodistrian University of Athens and earned a law degree in 1994. From 1994 to 1996, he attended Harvard Extension School, where he earned a master in International Relations, in 1996. He speaks English, French and Italian.

When he returned to Greece, worked as attorney.

Politics 
His political activity began at the Youth Organization of New Democracy. He was elected as member of the Hellenic Parliament on the New Democracy ticket in the Athens B constituency in the elections of 2000, 2004, 2007, 2009, May and June 2012, and January and September 2015. In the July 2019 election, he was elected MP for the Athens B2 (West) constituency.

Cabinet positions 
Varvitsiotis, served as Deputy Minister of Foreign Affairs for Economic Diplomacy and Development Assistance, from January to October 2009, in the Second Cabinet of Kostas Karamanlis. He also served as Minister for Shipping, Maritime Affairs and the Aegean, from June 2013 to January 2015, in the Cabinet of Antonis Samaras. From July 2019, serving as Alternate Minister of Foreign Affairs in the Cabinet of Kyriakos Mitsotakis.

References

External links 
 Official Website  (In Greek)

1969 births

Living people
Greek government officials
Greek MPs 2000–2004
Greek MPs 2004–2007
Greek MPs 2007–2009
Greek MPs 2009–2012
Greek MPs 2012 (May)
Greek MPs 2012–2014
Greek MPs 2015 (February–August)
Greek MPs 2015–2019
Greek MPs 2019–2023
New Democracy (Greece) politicians
Politicians from Athens
Greek lawyers
National and Kapodistrian University of Athens alumni
Harvard Extension School alumni